A masand was a representative and tithe collector in Sikhism. They were an officially appointed missionary minister representing the Sikh Guru, who baptized conversions to Sikhism, and collected dasvandh ("the tenth" of income) as an offering to the Sikh community and religious establishment. A masand forwarded the collected amount to the Sikh guru.

Etymology 
The word masand (Punjabi: ਮਸੰਦ) is an adaptation of the Persian term ‘masnad’ (Punjabi: ਮਸਨਦ), which refers to ‘a seat’ that is at a lower level than the throne. The Guru was the highest authority while masands were emplaced to spread the message of Sikhism and given the authority to baptize individuals converting to Sikhism. During conversions happening in the absence of the Guru, the new convert would touch the feet of the masand or drink the water they had dipped their toe in, in order to become initiated into the Sikh religion.

History: Origin and Structure 
It is unclear when the masand system started. It began with Guru Amar Das in some accounts, by Guru Ram Das in other accounts, or Guru Arjan by still other accounts.  A masand was appointed for each religious administrative unit called the Sikh Manji, a system that was founded by Guru Amar Das. This system was expanded by later Sikh Gurus.

Role in Sikhism 
The masand system was critical in empowering Sikhism with an independent economic resource pool, that helped pay for gurdwara (temple) building, for building a Sikh army and the upkeep of Sikh soldiers, as well routine expenses such as langar (kitchen) which offered a free meal to visitors to the Sikh temples.

The manji and masand system of revenue collection for Sikh temples and other purposes was a source of major dispute between the Sikh Gurus and the Mughal emperors. For example, Aurangzeb seized the tithe collections by the masands for use by the Mughal treasury, and demolished Sikh temples throughout Punjab to emphasize the Islamic character of the Mughal Empire.

Abolition of the Masand system 
Overtime, a few masands became corrupt and started treating themselves as Gurus to collect money for their personal motives. Hence, Guru Gobind Singh ordered Sikhs not to recognize those masands as authority figures and prohibited having any type of relationship with them or their deputies. According to early Sikh literature including rahitnamas, the Sikhs, under Guru Gobind's command, punished, beat and killed certain masands whose corruption, exploitation, and greed or inability to deliver sufficient money and resources had affronted the Guru.

List of Masands

During the time of Guru Hargobind 
 Bakht Mal
 Tara Chand

During the time of Guru Tegh Bahadur 
 Bidhi Chand
 Ramdas Ugar Sain

See also 

 Manji system, Sikh missionary administrative organization aimed towards men

 Piri system, Sikh missionary administrative organization aimed towards women

 Sects of Sikhism

References 

Sikh practices
Sikh politics
History of Sikhism